4-Iodo-N,N-dimethylaniline, usually called 4-iododimethylaniline, is an organic compound with the formula IC6H4N(CH3)2. It is a colourless, viscous liquid.  The compound is used to attach the dimethylanilinyl group to other substrates.

Synthesis
4-Iodo-dimethylaniline is prepared by iodination of dimethylaniline. 
C6H5NMe2 + I2 →  I:C6H4NMe2  +  HI

The iodination is so efficient that it has been recommended for quantifying the presence of iodine.

References

Anilines
Iodoarenes